William Ewart Harrison (27 December 1886 – August 1948) was an English footballer who played at outside right.

After a spell with Crewe Alexandra, he spent 1907 to 1920 with Wolverhampton Wanderers, the FA Cup in his first season there. He was later inducted into the club's Hall of Fame. He spent 1920 to 1922 with Manchester United, and later had one-season spells with Port Vale and Wrexham.

Career
Harrison played for Hough United, Crewe South End, Willaston White Star and Crewe Alexandra, before signing for fellow Second Division side Wolverhampton Wanderers for a £400 fee in summer 1907. His first season with the club ended in FA Cup glory, as they won the trophy after defeating Newcastle United 3–1 in the final, with Harrison scoring a fine individual goal. He remained at Molineux for nine full seasons, and 345 games in total.

During World War I he guested for Stoke. He played seven times for the Potters in 1915–16, 31 times in 1916–17, 33 times in 1917–18, and 28 times in 1918–19, scoring a total of 17 goals at the Victoria Ground. Stoke enjoyed some measure of success in the war leagues, finishing as runners-up of the Lancashire Section Secondary Competition Group D in 1916–17, champions of the Lancashire Section Primary Competition in 1917–18, and runners-up in both the Primary Competition and Group C in 1918–19. He returned to Wanderers for the 1919–20 season, as the club posted a 19th-place finish.

Harrison moved to Manchester United in October 1920. He went on to score five goals in 46 appearances for the Red Devils, helping United to finish 13th in 1920–21, before they suffered relegation out of the First Division in 1921–22. He left Old Trafford and joined Second Division rivals Port Vale in September 1922. He enjoyed a positive start to the 1922–23 campaign, scoring the only goal of the game against former club Manchester United at The Old Recreation Ground. He was a first-team regular until an ankle injury in October 1922 put him out of action until January 1923. He regained his spot but was sold to Wrexham for £300 in June of that year. He helped the Dragons to a 16th-place finish in the Third Division North in 1923–24, before he departed the Racecourse Ground at the age of 38.

Post-retirement
After retiring from football, Harrison was a pub landlord in Tettenhall, Wolverhampton. He had 10 children, and his wife gave birth to triplets on the day of the 1908 FA Cup Final. He died in August 1948, aged 61.

Career statistics
Source:

Honours
Wolverhampton Wanderers
FA Cup: 1908

Stoke
Lancashire Section Primary Competition: 1917–18

References

1886 births
1948 deaths
Sportspeople from Northwich
English footballers
Association football wingers
Crewe Alexandra F.C. players
Wolverhampton Wanderers F.C. players
Stoke City F.C. wartime guest players
Manchester United F.C. players
Port Vale F.C. players
Wrexham A.F.C. players
English Football League players
English Football League representative players
FA Cup Final players